The following list includes notable people who were born or have lived in Rockford, Illinois. For a similar list organized alphabetically by last name, see the category page People from Rockford, Illinois.

Academics, science, and engineering 

 James Henry Breasted, scholar, first American teacher of Egyptology
 Griffith Buck, rose breeder
 Richard Bulliet, scholar of the Middle East
 Robert Clodius, educator, acting President of the University of Wisconsin–Madison
 James A. Davis, chair of sociology department, Harvard University, and professor, University of Chicago
 Arnold Krammer, historian, resided in Rockford from 1970 to 1974 while on the faculty of Rockford College; at Texas A&M University from 1974 to retirement in 2015
 James Lindgren, law professor and sociologist, Northwestern University
 John Henry Manny, inventor, founder of Manny Reaper Works
 Fred Merkel, broadcast engineer for Premiere Networks and iHeartMedia
 Anna Peck Sill (1816-1889), educator
 Adaline Emerson Thompson, benefactor and educational leader
 Gordon Tullock, economist and one of the founders of public choice
 Janice E. Voss, astronaut and engineer; lived in Rockford   
 Daniel Hale Williams, surgeon, first doctor to successfully complete open heart surgery; founder of the first integrated American hospital, Provident Hospital of Cook County

Business 

 Virgil Abloh (1980–2021), fashion designer and businessman
 Robert Greenblatt, Fox, Showtime and NBC producer and executive, now Chairman of WarnerMedia Entertainment.
 Albert Henry Loeb (1868–1924), attorney and business executive, Sears
 Pehr August Peterson (1846–1927), business executive, Sundstrand Corporation
 John Sall, co-founder of SAS Institute
 Albert Spalding (1850–1915), co-founder of Spalding; pitcher with Rockford Forest Citys; manager of Chicago White Stockings; executive of National League of Baseball Clubs; inductee in National Baseball Hall of Fame

Entertainment and media

Acting 

 Ginger Lynn Allen, porn actress
 Jay Bauman, actor, director of popular YouTube channel RedLetterMedia
Jodi Benson, voice actress, Ariel in The Little Mermaid
 Barbara Hale, actress, Perry Mason
 Kathryn Layng, actress, Doogie Howser, M.D.
 Natasha Leggero, comedian, actress
 Joseph Mantello, actor, director, Wicked, Take Me Out, Assassins
 Andra Martin, actress, Up Periscope, The Thing That Couldn't Die
 Marin Mazzie, Tony Award nominated actress and singer known for, Kiss Me, Kate (1999-2001), and her other work in musical theater.
 Aidan Quinn, actor, Desperately Seeking Susan, Elementary
 Anthony Tyler Quinn, actor, Boy Meets World
 Betty Jane Rhodes, actress, singer, Sweater Girl, The Fleet's In
 Susan Saint James, actress, Kate & Allie, McMillan & Wife
 Linda Wallem, actress, writer, producer, Nurse Jackie
 Stephen Wallem, singer, actor, Nurse Jackie

Animation 

 Bill Kopp, animator

Cinematography 

 Declan Quinn, cinematographer, Leaving Las Vegas, Kama Sutra: A Tale of Love, U2's "I Still Haven't Found What I'm Looking For"

Directing 

 Bing Liu, director, Minding the Gap

Music 

 Emily Bear, pianist, composer
 Bun E. Carlos, drummer, Cheap Trick
 Chuckey Charles, film composer and music producer
 Kurt Elling, jazz vocalist, composer, lyricist
 Katherine Tanner Fisk, contralto concert singer
 Swan Hennessy, classical composer
 Joie De Vivre (band), emo band
 Sarah Kelly, singer, songwriter
 Matthew McDonough, drummer for Mudvayne
 Lou Musa, guitarist, The Verve Pipe 
 Ann Nesby, singer, producer, part of the urban Gospel group Sounds Of Blackness
 Rick Nielsen, lead guitarist for Cheap Trick
 Tom Petersson, bass guitarist for Cheap Trick
 Marty Ross, musician, songwriter and performer
 Jake Runestad, composer and conductor
 Nellie Strong Stevenson, pianist, music educator, clubwoman
 Shawn Wade, bass guitarist for 12 Stones
 Ryley Walker, guitarist
 Michelle Williams, part of the R&B group Destiny's Child
 Robin Zander, vocalist and rhythm guitarist for Cheap Trick

Photography 
 Alvin C. Jacobs Jr., documentary photographer and image activist

Reality 

 Paris Bennett, contestant on Season 5 of American Idol
 Kelly Killoren Bensimon model, former cast member of Real Housewives of New York City 
 Heather Nauert, news anchor on Fox News; born in Rockford

Special effects 

Shaun Smith, visual effects

Writing 

 Robert Lee Maupin Beck, writer, producer, Pimp: The Story of My Life
 Stewart Brand, writer, editor, publisher and environmentalist: The Whole Earth Catalog, The WELL, Long Now Foundation, and, Whole Earth Discipline: An Ecopragmatist Manifesto.
 Thomas Fleming, writer, editor, Chronicles: A Magazine of American Culture
 John Ortberg, author, pastor
 Will Pfeifer, comic book writer
 Shawn Ryan, television producer, screenwriter (The Shield)
 Barbara Santucci, artist, poet, author
 Erica Spindler, author
 Leopold Tyrmand, novelist, editor, dissident; originally from Poland
 Kimberla Lawson Roby, New York Times bestselling author
 Cora Stuart Wheeler (1852–1897), poet, author

Politics and law

 John B. Anderson, US Representative, US presidential candidate
 John Baumgarten, Illinois House of Representatives
 Debra Bowen, Secretary of State of California, 2007–2015
 William Brown, Illinois House of Representatives
 John T. Buckbee, US Representative
 Robert R. Canfield, Illinois state legislator and lawyer
 James E. Cartwright, US Marine Corps general; Vice Chairman Joint Chiefs of Staff
 Ho Chung, Patent attorney
 Mary Lou Cowlishaw, Illinois House of Representatives
 Barbara Giolitto, Illinois House of Representatives
 Edolo J. Giorgi, Illinois House of Representatives
 Rodney Grams, Republican United States Senator, news anchor, WIFR 23 Rockford
 Joyce Holmberg, educator and Illinois state senator
 Alta M. Hulett, attorney, first woman admitted to the state of Illinois Bar
 Betty Ann Keegan, Illinois State Senator
 Julia Lathrop, social and political activist, subject of biography My Friend, Julia Lathrop (1935) by Jane Addams
Emma Octavia Lundberg, Swedish-American child welfare advocate.
 Donald A. Manzullo, United States Representative
 Lynn Morley Martin, United States Representative, United States Secretary of Labor
 Stanley Mosk, Justice, Supreme Court of California
 David Campbell Mulford, United States Ambassador to India; Vice-Chairman International, Credit Suisse
 Paula J. Raschke-Lind, Illinois state politician
 Bertil T. Rosander, Illinois state legislator and businessman
 Benjamin R. Sheldon, Chief Justice of the Illinois Supreme Court
 Eric Sorensen, meterologist and politician
 Steve Stadelman, Illinois state senator
 Fred E. Sterling, Illinois politician
 Thomas E. Ticen, Minnesota state legislator and lawyer

Sports

Baseball

 Ross Barnes (1850–1915), second baseman, shortstop, Boston Red Stockings
 Aldine Calacurcio, All-American Girls Professional Baseball League player, Rockford Peaches, born in Rockford
 Hal Carlson, pitcher for Chicago Cubs
 Jean Cione, All-American Girls Professional Baseball League player, Rockford Peaches, born in Rockford
 Orville Jorgens, pitcher, Philadelphia Phillies
 Margaret Jurgensmeier, All-American Girls Professional Baseball League player, Rockford Peaches, born in Rockford
 Gene Lamont, catcher, coach, manager, Detroit Tigers, Pittsburgh Pirates, Chicago White Sox
 Berith Melin, All-American Girls Professional Baseball League player, Rockford Peaches, born in Rockford
 Rodney Myers, pitcher, Chicago Cubs, San Diego Padres, Los Angeles Dodgers
 Hattie Peterson, All-American Girls Professional Baseball League player, Rockford Peaches, born in Winnebago, Illinois
 Ken Rudolph, catcher, Chicago Cubs, St. Louis Cardinals, San Francisco Giants, Baltimore Orioles
 Jake Smolinski, outfielder, Texas Rangers; born in Rockford
 Harry Sullivan, pitcher, St. Louis Cardinals
 Ed Swartwood, player, umpire, Pittsburgh Pirates
 Charles Swindells, catcher, St. Louis Cardinals
 Daniel E. Tipple, pitcher, New York Yankees; born in Rockford

Basketball 

Lorenzo Brown (born 1990), basketball player in the Israeli Basketball Premier League, formerly in the NBA
 Bill Erickson, player for Illinois in 1949 Final Four
 John E. Erickson, coach, University of Wisconsin, and GM of Milwaukee Bucks
 Ernie Kent, coach, Washington State University and University of Oregon
 JP Tokoto (born 1993), basketball player for Hapoel Tel Aviv of the Israeli Basketball Premier League
 Fred VanVleet, point guard with Toronto Raptors, NBA Champion (2019), and 2017-2018 Sixth Man of the Year finalist, NBA All-Star (2021-22)

Billiards 

 Dallas West, pool player; inducted into the Billiards Congress of America Hall of Fame (1996)

Boxing 

 Kenneth Gould, boxer, 1988 United States Olympics welterweight bronze medalist
 Sammy Mandell, boxer, World Boxing Association lightweight champion

Diving 

 Ronald Merriott, Olympic diver; 1984 bronze medalist

Football 

 John Blake, nose guard, coach, University of Oklahoma, Dallas Cowboys
 Merwin Hodel, fullback, New York Giants
 Jerry Latin, halfback, St Louis Cardinals 
 Dean Lowry, defensive end, Green Bay Packers
 Ira Matthews, halfback, Oakland Raiders
 Walt McGaw, guard, Green Bay Packers
 Carlos Polk, linebacker, Dallas Cowboys
 Ken Roskie, fullback, Green Bay Packers, Detroit Lions
 Brock Spack, head coach, Illinois State University
 Jerry Stalcup, linebacker, Los Angeles Rams
James Robinson, halfback, Jacksonville Jaguars

Golf 
 Dave Barclay, golfer, 1947 national collegiate champion
 Jeff Mitchell, pro golfer

Ice skating 

 Alexe Gilles, champion figure skater
 Janet Lynn Nowicki, ice skater, 5-time national champion, 1972 Olympic bronze medalist
 Piper Gilles, Olympic figure skater

Mixed martial arts 
 Corey Anderson, mixed martial artist (Bellator Fighting Championship)
 Daniel Roberts, mixed martial artist

Motor racing

 Chad Knaus, crew chief, Jimmie Johnson, seven-time NASCAR Sprint Cup Series champion

Mountaineering 

 Ed Viesturs, high-altitude mountaineer

Soccer 

 Steve Cherundolo, defender for the US Men's National Team and Hannover 96 in Germany's Bundesliga
 Peri Marosevic, forward for the Toronto FC
 Bryan Namoff, defender and midfielder for D.C. United
 Brad Ring, midfielder for the San Jose Earthquakes

Wrestling 

 Stephanie Bellars, wrestling manager; married to Paul Caiafa of the Misfits

References

Rockford
Rockford